Viña del Mar (meaning "Vineyard of the Sea") is a city and commune on central Chile's Pacific coast. Viña del Mar is also part of the Greater Valparaíso area, the country's second largest metropolitan area (pop. 935,602, 2017 census), after the Metropolitan area of Santiago . The Greater Valparaíso Area is home to five municipalities: Valparaíso, Viña del Mar, Concon, Quilpue and Villa Alemana.

History

Origins 

The valley where Viña del Mar was founded was known as the valley of Peuco by the Changos, native inhabitants of the area dedicated to fishing.  With the arrival of the Spanish conquistadores the valley was divided into two large haciendas. North of the Marga Marga creek up to the current location of Reñaca, Viña del Mar, and to the south up to the current Cerro Barón (Baron Hill), the Hacienda Las Siete Hermanas (The Seven Sisters).

Francisco Javier Alvares authorized the construction of a railroad through his lands to join Santiago and the port of Valparaíso. The arrival of the railroad brought a young engineer Jose Francisco Vergara who married Francisco Javier Alvares's granddaughter, Mercedes Alvares. It was José Francisco Vergara who instigated the idea of the creation of a new city independent of Valparaíso.

Arrival of the railroad and founding 

The establishment of Refinadora de Azúcar de Viña del Mar (Sugar Refining Company), CRAV in 1873 and the foundation of the Lever, Murphy & Co. by the British Richard Lever and William Murphy in 1883,  that gave the necessary economic impulse to transform the young city into one of the most important cities of Chile. The building of a military installation, Regimiento Coraceros in 1917, naval facilities in Las Salinas, and the housing of military and naval personnel furthered the city's growth. That year, also, a seaside villa was rebuilt as what is known today as Wulff Castle.

In 1925, the Teatro Municipal was opened in its current location in the eastern front of the city's downtown square, Plaza de Viña del Mar. In 1928 president Carlos Ibáñez del Campo authorized the creation of a casino, securing the future and the touristy character of the city. The Casino Municipal de Viña del Mar was opened on December 31, 1930.  On January 31, 1931, the Presidential Palace was inaugurated in Cerro Castillo (Castle Hill) as a summer residence for the Chilean President. The touristy character of the city was furthered with the inauguration of the O'Higgins Hotel in 1936 and the inauguration of the Miramar Hotel by Caleta Abarca Beach in 1945.  For a few years in the early 1960s, a trolleybus line connected the city with Valparaíso, and the electric route network included three branches within Viña.

Viña del Mar was one of the four host cities of the 1962 football (soccer) World Cup.  It is now home to CD Everton, a soccer team in the Chilean Premier division, which took its name from the English team.

According to the 1982 movie, Missing and other sources, Vina Del Mar was focal point for the plotters of the 1973 Chilean coup d'état.

Viña del Mar was declared a sister city of Sausalito, California (a city north of San Francisco), in 1971. To demonstrate the sister city relationship, you can find a square (plaza) called "Viña del Mar" in downtown Sausalito, and a "Sausalito" stadium and "Sausalito" lagoon in Viña del Mar. Viña del Mar is also a sister city of Mar del Plata, Argentina since 1993. 

During the 1980s, a global economic downturn seriously affected the city, a number of small and medium-sized factories went bankrupt, including the stationery manufacturer Coda, and most importantly, CRAV, and Textiles Viña, two of the biggest employers in the city. Unemployment rose to alarmingly high rates. Many factories started to consolidate their operations in Santiago making the situation even worse. The city has failed to fully recover from the blows inflicted by the economic downturn of 1982, but an increase in the number of international tourists visiting the city, and the recent high prices of copper in world markets have promoted an economic recovery. 

Extensive commercial redevelopment in the 15 Norte Avenue area, previously an abandoned industrial area, has seen most of the large Chilean retail chains settling in the area, which is now covered with large shopping malls, like Marina Arauco, cinemas, fast food stores, and supermarkets.

The city has benefitted from major investments in infrastructure that have greatly improved the traffic flow in the downtown area, especially in routes connecting Viña del Mar with Santiago, Valparaíso and Quilpué. A modern and efficient subway (Merval) connects Viña del Mar with the cities of Limache and Valparaíso, following the original railroad tracks between Valparaíso and Santiago.

The city was affected by the February 27, 2010 earthquake.

City landmarks

Visitors and locals enjoy the parks and water fountains of the city, including a large flower clock (Reloj de Flores) with its numbers made up of flowering plants, near Caleta Abarca beach. The Valparaiso Sporting Club horse racing track is another major landmark. Jardín Botánico or Parque del Salitre, a large botanical garden on the outskirts of the city, was originally designed and built by an entrepreneur who became wealthy from exploiting saltpeter resources in northern Chile.

A few buildings from the 19th century still remain after multiple earthquakes that have destroyed most of the old areas of the city. Most of the older buildings that remain are located along Avenida Libertad (Liberty Avenue), Quillota Street and Quinta Vergara, a large park in the middle of the city. The presidential summer residence, Palacio Presidencial (Presidential Palace) is located on Cerro Castillo (Castle Hill).

The city's casino was designed in art deco style and is surrounded by well-tended gardens (hence the city's nickname). In 2002, a hotel (Hotel del Mar) was added to the 1930s building, resembling the architectural features of the original building.

Palacio Rioja, a mansion built by Fernando Rioja in 1907, located on Quillota Street, houses an environmental museum. The Fonck Museum, located in Cuatro Norte Street, has a large exhibition of pre-Columbian articles, and a large moai (Easter Island statue made of volcanic rock), the only one in mainland Chile, is also on display. Palacio Carrasco, built by Emilio Carrasco in 1912, now houses the Municipal Library and also is used for arts exhibitions. The building is also surrounded by nice gardens adorned with fine sculptures including a Rodin. Palacio Vergara located in Quinta Vergara was built by Blanca Vergara (daughter of José Francisco) in 1906 and it is now owned by the municipality. It currently houses the School of Fine Arts and has produced important Chilean artists like the painter Giancarlo Bertini.

Brunet Castle (also known as "Castillo Yarur") was built in 1923 by Adolfo Brunet on Cerro Castillo, close to the presidential mansion. Currently it is owned by Carabineros de Chile (Chilean police) and is used as a reception center for important visitors. It was declared a national monument in 2005.

Palacio Carrasco and its surrounding park, located on Liberty Avenue #250, between 3 and 4 Norte, was completed in 1923. For years it was a private residence until it moved to the Municipality of Viña del Mar. After moving it to its current location in Arlegui street, the Palacio Carrasco became a Library Benjamín Vicuña Mackenna, public library of the commune, while working as center for events, art exhibitions, and cultural workshops. It is very important to stress that the building is totally unsuitable for use as a public library and the community needs a new building for this purpose. Outside the entrance to the Palacio Carrasco there is a sculpture by Auguste Rodin called "La Defensa." It was declared a national historic monument on September 8, 1986 under Supreme Decree No. 791.

Castillo Wulff, is an iconic building of the commune of neo-Tudor style, built in 1906. Strategically located in the coastal border between the mouth of Marga Marga and Caleta Abarca (Avenida Marina N° 37). It was built by Don Gustavo Wulff Mowle (1862–1946) a businessman and philanthropist of Valparaíso. The building was designed in two floors connected to a torreón through a medieval-style bridge. In 1995 it was declared a national monument, but today houses the offices of the headquarters of the Heritage Unit of the Municipality of Viña del Mar. It is also the location of the distinguished Castillo del Mar (Club Árabe, a seafood restaurant).

Culture

Numerous bars and restaurants have recently opened in the area around Plaza México and Avenida San Martín, offering Chilean and international cuisine. Seafood restaurants are located on the Camino Costero (Coast Roadway) that joins Viña del Mar and Concón, a coastal town to the north.

The Yacht Club de Chile is a yacht club located in Caleta Higuerillas. This club was established in Viña del Mar in 1955, though it is now part of the Concón municipality.

The VTR Open was a professional men's tennis tournament played yearly on outdoor red clay courts at the Club Naval de Campo Las Salinas.

The Viña del Mar International Film Festival is considered among the most important film festivals in Chile and Latin America. 

Another important event is the Viña del Mar International Song Festival, held at the amphitheater located in the Quinta Vergara, one of the largest green areas of the city. The amphitheater of the Quinta Vergara was built in the 1960s. 

There is also the Palacio Vergara, home to Viña's fine arts museum.

The Municipal Theatre of Viña del Mar, located in front of Plaza de Viña, is a center of cultural and artistic events of first importance in Chile. In the neighboring block is also the traditional and elegant Club de Viña, with its classical facade.

The Museum of Naval Canons is an outdoor museum, located on the road Jorge Montt (connecting Viña del Mar with the beaches of Las Salinas and Reñaca), whose beach exhibits several pieces of artillery in front of the facilities of the Chilean Navy.

The Fonk Museum  founded in 1937, is a varied and complete museum that shows objects from native villages from cultures such as Rapanui, atacameños, Diaguitas and Mapuches, in addition to a wide collection of Peruvian pre-Columbian jars. In the area of natural sciences there is a sample of arthropods and animals of different zones of the country.

Climate

Viña del Mar has a warm-summer Mediterranean climate influenced on the coast by the Humboldt Current. As in any Mediterranean climate, the city experiences a dry, warm summer but temperatures rarely exceed  due to the influence of the maritime current offshore. Spring and autumn can vary from mild to cool. The rain falls mainly in autumn and winter, with July being the rainiest (107 mm). The average annual rainfall totals 480 mm.

Education
Several superior educational institutions (universities), both public and private, are located in Viña del Mar:
 Pontificia Universidad Católica de Valparaíso with its Architecture (Recreo), Arts (Miraflores), Philosophy and Education (Sausalito) and History (Alvarez Avenue) campus
 Universidad de Valparaíso has Business and Administration, Marine Sciences and Engineering faculties
 Universidad Técnica Federico Santa María located in the limit between Valparaiso and Viña del Mar (España avenue).
 Universidad de Viña del Mar located in Rodelillo.
 Universidad Andrés Bello
 Universidad del Mar
 Universidad de las Américas
 Universidad Adolfo Ibáñez
 Instituto Profesional ARCOS

The Chilean Navy also operates several technical schools and a planetarium in Las Salinas at the northwest edge of the city.

International schools in Viña del Mar:
 Scuola Italiana Arturo Dell' Oro

Demographics
According to the 2002 census of the National Statistics Institute, Viña del Mar had 286,931 inhabitants (136,318 men and 150,613 women), making the commune an entirely urban area. The population grew by 0.5% (1,477 persons) between the 1992 and 2002 censuses. Viña del Mar accounts for 18.63% of the regional population.

Notable residents

The city is the birthplace of Alberto Hurtado, the second Chilean Catholic saint and founder of the Hogar de Cristo (Home of Christ) foundation, writer María Luisa Bombal (author of La Ultima Niebla (The Last Fog)), former Chilean president Patricio Aylwin, Environment minister María Ignacia Benítez, handball player Marco Oneto, Olympic champion tennis player Nicolás Massú, world champion boxer Patricia Demick, Slayer vocalist/bassist Tom Araya, composer Sylvia Soublette, and the sculptor and performance artist Tamara Jacquin.

It was also the home of Philips CEO and wealthy businessman Cor Dillen, as well as Australian fashion model, actress and television presenter Pia Miller (formerly Loyola). Footballer, George Robledo of Newcastle United and Colo-Colo, was a long-term resident of the town.

Administration
As a municipality, Viña del Mar is a third-level administrative division of Chile governed by a municipal council, headed by an alcalde (mayor) who is elected every four years. Frente Amplio politician Macarena Ripamonti is the 2021-2024 mayor of Viña del Mar.

Economy 
Viña del Mar, along with the rest of the coastal municipalities of Greater Valparaíso, is part of the tourist area of the country, which has resulted in large dividends paid by this industry each year to the community. Viña del Mar has a wide range of hotels and has upgraded its infrastructure to improve its tourist appeal.

An important place is the Casino de Viña del Mar, which opened in 1930 and for years was one of the few casinos in Chile. The casino also houses the Hotel del Mar. With the introduction of the Gambling Casinos Act, which resulted in increased competition, viñamarino enclosure has suffered great economic losses, thus affecting the municipal coffers.

The industrial district of Viña del Mar is called El Salto. It is located in the place where the Estero Marga Marga Delta begins to appear. They give access to the metro and the South Trunk Highway.

Viña del Mar has the largest number of businesses in the city of Valparaíso, which, along with other areas of Santiago, is becoming a favorite for business to establish investment locations. Forbes also considered one of the most exclusive resorts in Latin America, the level of Punta del Este in Uruguay, Pucón in southern Chile and Mar del Plata in Argentina.

Currently performed one of the most important events in Hispanic America haute couture, together with those of Buenos Aires, Santiago, Sao Paulo, and Rio de Janeiro.

Transport 

The route used to get from Santiago to Vina del Mar is the Route CH-68 or Pacific Highway, which connects the capital to the city of Valparaiso.

The main routes connecting the city with other municipalities of Gran Valparaíso are:

Avenida España, which connects Valparaíso with Viña. 
The Troncal and Troncal Norte Roads, link Viña with Quilpué and Villa Alemana. 
The Borgoño and Edmundo Eluchans avenues linking Reñaca Viña and Concon with the commune. 
The Way International and Southern Trunk Highway, allowing quick connection to and from the towns of the interior.

The busiest avenues of Viña del Mar, and virtually the entire Gran Valparaíso, are the main arteries in the community plan and the Población Vergara: Avenida San Martín, Avenida Libertad Quillota street, Viana-Alvares Avenue, Avenida 1 Norte, Avenida Benidorm (former Av. 15 Norte), Avenida Agua Santa, Avenida La Marina, Avenida Borgoño and Av. Jorge Montt (Las Salinas Rect). This because they absorb all the traffic of workers and students moving from other municipalities to their work and study sites located in the plan from Valparaiso.

Public transport 
As of January 6, 2007 has been implemented Metropolitan Transportation Plan Greater Valparaíso which allows the communes of Valparaíso, Viña del Mar, Concon, Quilpué and Villa Alemana have an organized transportation system, which has the preferably provide order, security to users. And over all, speed of travel, for which the same routes of the previous system are made, but in an orderly manner, through the implementation of a GPS system, enabling the companies concerned to each business unit overseeing the entire course, speed and low frequency.

It passes through Viña del Mar in a  underground stretch (from Miramar through Chorrillos stations) opened in 2005, after major upgrade works on the line.

Sports 
The development of sports in the city began with the founding of Valparaiso Sporting Club, also known as Sporting, in 1882.  It is a Club whose function is to house as many sports as possible, but from the beginning, it mostly identified with horseback riding. Since 1885, the club has hosted the horse race known as The Derby, one of the most classic races of Chilean equestrianism, being part of the national Triple Crown. Its facilities have also hosted clubs of cricket, soccer, golf, tennis – and if we include the nearby Viña del Mar Lawn Tennis Club, rugby, paper chase, and polo. It is also worth mentioning that Sporting was the site of the first international soccer game played in the country.  The game was between the national team and the Argentina national team.  Sporting also was the only venue for the South American Championship in 1920.

For rugby fans, each summer in January, The Mackay School offers two Rugby sevens, one for youth and one for adults.  The tournament is usually 2 days long for the youth, and 3 days for the adults, with participating teams coming from Chile, Argentina, and Uruguay.

Soccer is represented in the city by the Everton Club of Viña del Mar, which was founded in 1909 on Alegre Hill in Valparaíso.  The club was later moved to Viña del Mar in the 1940s. The Everton team owns 4 First Division national titles and plays locally at the Sausalito Stadium (Estadio Suasalito in Spanish), home of the 1962 FIFA World Cup, Copa America 1991, and Copa America 2015. The first team created in the city independent of the clubs of Valparaiso was the Sporting Club de Viña which is said to have played and tied the first international soccer match in Chile.

International relations

Viña del Mar cooperates with:

 Rosario, Argentina
 Asunción, Paraguay
 Panama City, Panama
 San José, Costa Rica
 Guayaquil, Ecuador

References

External links 

  Municipality of Viña del Mar
  Viña del Mar commercial guide

Communes of Chile
Populated places established in 1878
Populated places in Valparaíso Province
1878 establishments in Chile